Dhamne S.Bailur is a village in Belagavi district in the state of Karanataka, India.

Dhamne S.Bailur is a village bordering Maharashtra but falls in Karnataka

About
According to Census 2011 i Dhamne S Bailur village is located in Belgaum Tehsil of Belgaum district in Karnataka, India. It is situated 25 km away from Belgaum. As per 2009 stats, Belawatti is the gram panchayat of Dhamne S Bailur village.

Geography
The total geographical area of village is 1664.15 hectares. Dhamne S Bailur has a total population of 528 peoples. There are about 93 houses in Dhamne S Bailur village. Belgaum is nearest town to Dhamne S Bailur which is approximately 25 km away.

References

Villages in Belagavi district